Ogulchánsky (pol. Ogulcansky) is a Slavic surname. It is represented in the Cyrillic alphabet as "Огульчанский".

Origin 
The surname Ogulchansky got its name from the word "огульный" that means "wholesale" in Russian, that says that the first representatives of this surname were merchants.

Notable people 
Yuri Antonovich Ogulchansky — (1932—2007) — Ukrainian national activist and writer.
Alexey Jakovlevich Ogulchansky — (1912—1996) — Ukrainian writer of Jewish origin and Azov explorer.
Conan Gerasimovich Ogulchansky — Ukrainian nobleman of Polish origin.

External links
Фамилия Огульчанский 
Краевед и писатель Алексей Яковлевич Огульчанский

Slavic-language surnames